Wróblik may refer to:

 Wróblik, Warmian-Masurian Voivodeship
 Wróblik Królewski
 Wróblik Szlachecki